Higuera de la Sierra is a town and municipality located in the province of Huelva, Spain. , it has a population of 1,437 inhabitants.

References

External links
Higuera de la Sierra - Sistema de Información Multiterritorial de Andalucía

Municipalities in the Province of Huelva